The 1994 Supercupa României was the first edition of Romania's season opener cup competition. The match was played in Bucharest at Stadionul Național on 20 August 1994, and was contested between Divizia A title holders, Steaua București and Cupa României champions, Gloria Bistrița. Steaua București became the first winner of the trophy after a goal scored by Marian Popa in extra time.

Match

References

Supercupa României
1994 in association football
FC Steaua București matches